Matiz may refer to:
 Daewoo Matiz, or Matiz, a make of car
 Matiz, a surname; notable people include:
 Francisco Javier Matiz (1763–1851), Colombian-born painter and botanical illustrator
 Giacomo Matiz (born 1986), (born 1986), Italian skier
 Leo Matiz (1917–1998), Colombian photographer, newspaper publisher, and painter
 Mabel Matiz (born 1985), Turkish pop music singer-songwriter

See also 
 Matis (disambiguation)